Mateu is a Catalan name, meaning Matthew. Notable people with the name include:

Given name
 Mateu Morral (1880–1906), Spanish anarchist

Surname
 Antonio Mateu Lahoz (born 1977), Spanish football referee
 Jaume Mateu (1382–1452), Valencian painter of the Gothic style
 Marc Mateu (born 1990), Spanish football midfielder

See also
 Sant Mateu (disambiguation)

Catalan masculine given names
Catalan-language surnames